Mister Spain is an annual Spanish beauty pageant for young men in Spain.

Titleholders

List of Mister Spain at International pageants
Color key

Mister International
Between 2009 and 2012 runner-up of Mister España went to Mister International pageant. Since 2013 the winner of Mister España represents his country at the Mister International. On occasion, when the winner does not qualify (due to age) for either contest, a runner-up is sent.

Mister World
Mister España traditionally represents the grand winners to the Mister World. Since 2012 Mister World Spain casts in separation casting.

Mister Global

See also
 Mister World
 Mister International
 Miss Spain

External links
 Official Site
 Mister España

Spain
Beauty pageants in Spain
Spanish awards
Mister Global by country